Juan Salcedo may refer to:
Juan Salcedo (bishop) (1520 - 1562), Roman Catholic Archbishop of Santo Domingo
Juan de Salcedo (1549 – 1576), Spanish conquistador
Juan Salcedo, Jr., former Secretary of the Department of Health in the Philippines